The Fort 17 (Ukrainian: Форt-17) is a semi-automatic pistol which was designed in the year 2004 by Ukrainian firearms designer RPC Fort.

Description and design details
The pistol is similar to the Fort 12, but is much lighter. It also features a removable grip backstrap to fit a particular shooter.

Variants
 Fort 17 - designed for 9 x 18 mm PM cartridge
 Fort 17 Curz - designed for 9 mm Kurz cartridge
 Kobra (Кобра) - IPSC sport pistol, 9×18mm Makarov cartridge
 Kordon («Кордон») — sporting pistol designed for .22 Long Rifle. 10 rounds box magazine.
 Fort 17R (Форt-17Р) - non-lethal gas pistol with the ability to fire ammunition with rubber bullets.
 Fort 17T (Форt-17T) - non-lethal gas pistol with the ability to fire ammunition with rubber bullets.

Accessories 
 LT-6A (ЛТ-6А) - gun-mounted flashlight which can be mounted below the barrel.
 Migdal (Мигдаль) - a helmet-mounted weapon accessory invented for special forces; it allows its operator to both see and attack an armed target using a periscope-like lens, without exposing the operator to counterattack.

Users 
 :
 Fort-17 - in November 2010 121 pistols were sold to security guards of State Savings Bank of Ukraine; in July 2011 - 100 pistols were sold to Ministry of Internal Affairs; in April 2012 - extra 118 pistols were sold to security guards of "Ukrhydroenergo". In 2014 Fort-17 was adopted in Ukrainian Army In July 2015 "Fort-17" pistol was adopted as standard service pistol for National Police of Ukraine
 Fort-17R and Fort 17T - are allowed for private security guards
 :
 Fort-17T - imports were allowed since 2007 until July 2011 Since August 2014 Ukraine have banned the export of arms and military products to Russia (incl. magazines and other spare parts for previously sold Fort-17T pistols)
 : 
 Fort-17 - at least several pistols

References

External links
 M. R. Popenker. Fort 17 pistol / "Modern Firearms"
 Пистолет «Форт-17» / RPC "Fort" official website

Semi-automatic pistols of Ukraine
9×18mm Makarov semi-automatic pistols
.380 ACP semi-automatic pistols